"Dunarea de Jos" University of Galati (Romanian Universitatea „Dunărea de Jos” din Galați) is a public university located in Galați, Romania. It was founded in 1974.

History
The University of Galați, as it was named at first, was founded in July 1974 by merging the Polytechnic Institute and the Pedagogical Institute. The Polytechnic Institute of Galați had at its origins in the Land Improvement Institute founded in 1948, and the Naval and Mechanical Engineering Institute which has been founded in 1951. In 1953, the Institute of Fish Breeding and Fishing Technology, located in Constanța, transferred to Galați and merged with the Naval and Agronomic Institutes under the name of Technical Institute of Galați. In 1955, the Institute for Food Industry of Bucharest was also transferred to Galați. Two years later, these higher education institutions were to become the Polytechnic Institute of Galați.

The Pedagogical Institute of Galați was founded in 1959 and consisted of five faculties: Languages, Mathematics, Physics-Chemistry, Natural Sciences, and Sports. The two higher education institutions, the Polytechnic Institute and the Pedagogical Institute, merged in 1974 and formed the University of Galați. In 1991, the university was renamed "Dunărea de Jos" ("Lower Danube") University, after the historical name of the area around the city of Galați.

Organization
The University of Galați consists of twelve faculties and two colleges with more than thirty departments. It has several unique fields of education in the country, such as: Naval Engineering and Fishery. During the years, specialists covering a wide range of education fields have been trained at the University of Galați:
Engineers
Teachers
Economists
Programmers and Computer System Designers.

New university programmes has been developed in the last years: Management in Industry, Finances and Credit, International Economics Relations, Administration and Technical Informatics. Post-graduation courses for engineers and training courses for the teachers of the pre-university level are organised every year.

The University of Galați organises programs for the doctoral degree and master's degree in the technical fields of chemistry, physics, mathematics, economy, food technology and fishing, automatic control and computation techniques, artificial intelligence. The University of Galați is also providing programs for the doctoral degree in the field of social and humanistic sciences.

The university has 14 faculties, one cross–border faculty, and one department:
Faculty of Engineering
Faculty of Computer Science
Faculty of Automation, Computer Sciences, Electronics and Electrical Engineering
Faculty of Naval Architecture
Faculty of Food Science and Engineering
Faculty of Engineering and Agronomy in Brăila
Faculty of Sciences and Environment
Faculty of Letters 
Faculty of Physical Education and Sport
Faculty of Economic and Business Administration
Faculty of Social, Political and Legal Sciences
Faculty of Medicine and Pharmacy
Faculty of History, Philosophy and Theology
Faculty of Arts
Cross–border Faculty of Humanities, Economic and Engineering Sciences, in collaboration with State University of Cahul - Republic of Moldova
Department of Teacher Training

See also
 List of universities in Romania

References

External links

University of Galați Website 

1974 establishments in Romania
Educational institutions established in 1974
Galati
Medical schools in Romania
Buildings and structures in Galați
Education in Galați
Brăila